The 1914 Ole Miss Rebels football team represented the University of Mississippi during the 1914 college football season. The team shutout LSU.

Schedule

References

Mississippi
Ole Miss Rebels football seasons
Ole Miss Rebels football